Verda M. Colvin (born 1964/1965) is an associate justice of the Supreme Court of Georgia and former judge of the Georgia Court of Appeals.

Education 

Colvin received her bachelor's degree from Sweet Briar College and her Juris Doctor from the University of Georgia School of Law in 1993.

Legal career

Previously, she served as an Assistant United States Attorney for the Middle District of Georgia, Assistant District Attorney for the Clayton County District Attorney's Office, Assistant General Counsel for Clark Atlanta University, Assistant Solicitor for the Solicitor's Office in Athens-Clarke County, and as an associate for Ferguson, Stein, Watt, Wallas, and Gresham.

Judicial career

State court service 

Colvin was appointed to the Macon Circuit Superior Court by Georgia Governor Nathan Deal on March 24, 2014. A March 25, 2016, address by Colvin to a group of students as part of a “Consider the Consequences” program for at-risk students that Judge Colvin was unaware was being recorded went viral and was viewed hundreds of thousands of times, picked up by local, national and international media, and played by teachers for their students. In June 2019, she was appointed to a state judicial commission.

Appointment to Georgia Court of Appeals 

On March 27, 2020, Governor Brian Kemp appointed Colvin to the Georgia Court of Appeals. She was sworn in on April 10, 2020. She is the state's first African-American female appointed to the Georgia Court of Appeals by a Republican governor.

Appointment to Georgia Supreme Court 

On July 20, 2021,  Colvin was appointed to the Supreme Court of Georgia by Governor Brian Kemp, to the seat vacated by justice Harold Melton, who retired on July 1, 2021.

References

External links

|-

1960s births
Living people
20th-century American women lawyers
20th-century American lawyers
21st-century American judges
21st-century American women judges
African-American judges
Assistant United States Attorneys
District attorneys in Georgia (U.S. state)
Georgia Court of Appeals judges
African-American women lawyers
People from Atlanta
Justices of the Supreme Court of Georgia (U.S. state)
North Carolina lawyers
Sweet Briar College alumni
University of Georgia School of Law alumni
20th-century African-American women
20th-century African-American people
21st-century African-American women
21st-century African-American people